The Geely Panda Mini EV is an electric car that has been manufactured by Geely since 2022. It was originally intended to be sold under the Geometry marque, but it was decided to be marketed under the Geely brand instead.

It made its official debut at a shopping mall in the city of Hangzhou in December 2022.

Overview
Spotted in a series of photos from China's Ministry of Industry and Information Technology, the Panda has a square shape, similar to the Wuling Hongguang Mini EV. It sports a pair of simple circular headlights while it lacks a front grille.

References

Production electric cars
Cars of China
Electric city cars
Rear-wheel-drive vehicles
Rear-engined vehicles
Cars introduced in 2022
Microcars
Hatchbacks